Hypertoughness (stylised in all caps) is the sixth studio album by Japanese electronicore band Fear, and Loathing in Las Vegas. It was released on 4 December 2019 through Warner Music Japan. It is the first album to feature new bassist Tetsuya, who replaced Kei due to his death on an acute heart failure at his home on midnight of 12 January.

Background and promotion
On 31 January 2018, the band released a new PV for the song "Keep the Heat and Fire Yourself Up" which is also the opening for the anime Hakyū Hōshin Engi. The full single was released 2 May 2018. The band also provided "The Gong of Knockout" for the second opening for Netflix and TMS Entertainment's anime adaptation of Baki the Grappler in 2018. On 4 December, the band released the album in Japan with an announcement that the worldwide release date is set on 15 January 2020.

Track listing

Personnel
Fear, and Loathing in Las Vegas
 So – clean vocals, backing unclean vocals, programming
 Minami – unclean vocals, rapping, keyboards, programming
 Taiki – guitars, backing vocals
 Tetsuya – bass, backing vocals
 Tomonori – drums, percussion

Charts

Certifications

References

Fear, and Loathing in Las Vegas (band) albums
2019 albums